Marc Brockmann Olsen (born 15 January 1986) is a Danish professional football (soccer) player and Backgammon Grandmaster.

Football
Olsen plays as a midfielder. He has played professionally for Danish clubs including Brøndby IF, and also one season for South Melbourne FC in Australia.

Marc Olsen debuted for Brøndby's first team 5 November 2006 against FC København. His favourite position is as a left midfielder.

Backgammon
Olsen is a G2 Grandmaster in Backgammon, and an author of books on Backgammon strategy.  He also presents the YouTube channel "Backgammon Galaxy", teaching strategies from beginner to advanced level.

Bibliography
Backgammon: From Basics to Badass (2015)
Backgammon: Pure Strategy (2017)
Backgammon - Cube like a boss: Patterns, Intuition & Strategy (2019)

References

External links 
 Danish national team profile
 Brøndby IF profile
 Career stats at Danmarks Radio

Association football midfielders
1986 births
Living people
Danish men's footballers
Hvidovre IF players
Brøndby IF players
SønderjyskE Fodbold players
Danish Superliga players
AB Tårnby players
Danish backgammon players